, also known as just Yatsugatake is a volcanic group of inactive volcanoes located on the border of Nagano Prefecture and Yamanashi Prefecture on Honshū in Japan.

Description
The Southern Yatsugatake Volcanic Group is part of the Yatsugatake Mountains. The southern group is defined as the mountains south of the Natsuzawa Pass. The highest peak of the mountains is Mount Aka and the elevation is 2,899 metres.

The southern Yatugatake mountains are steep and have alpine characteristics. The mountains of the Northern Yatsugatake Volcanic Group are gentler and lower.

This volcanic group is listed among the 100 famous mountains in Japan. There the mountains are listed as Yatsugatake. Mount Tateshina is also part of the Yatsugatake mountains, but is listed separately.

These mountains are part of the Yatsugatake-Chūshin Kōgen Quasi-National Park.

Geology
The volcanoes are stratovolcanoes that are 1 million to 200,000 years old. The rock is mainly basalt and andesite.

Climate

List of peaks
The following peaks make up the Southern Yatsugatake Volcanic Group:

Gallery

See also
List of mountains in Japan
List of volcanoes in Japan

References

External links
Welcome to Yatsugatake
Official Home Page of the Geographical Survey Institute in Japan

See also
Yatsugatake-Chūshin Kōgen Quasi-National Park
Yatsugatake Mountains - Northern Yatsugatake Volcanic Group
List of mountains in Japan

Yatsugatake
Yatsugatake
Yatsugatake
Yatsugatake
Volcanic groups
Yatsugatake Mountains